Oba Chandler (October 11, 1946 – November 15, 2011) was an American serial killer and mass murderer who was convicted and executed for the June 1989 murders of Joan Rogers and her two daughters, whose bodies were found floating in Tampa Bay, Florida, with their hands and feet bound. Autopsies showed the victims had been thrown into the water while still alive, with ropes tied to a concrete block around their necks. The case became high-profile in 1992 when local police posted billboards bearing enlarged images of the suspect's handwriting recovered from a pamphlet in the victims' car. Chandler was identified as the killer when his neighbor recognized the handwriting.

Prior to his arrest, Chandler worked as an unlicensed aluminum-siding contractor. Against the advice of his attorneys, he testified in his own defense, saying he had met the Ohio women and had given them directions. Chandler said he never saw them again, except in newspaper coverage and on the billboards set up by authorities. Police originally theorized that two men were involved in the murders, but this was discounted once Chandler was arrested. Following his conviction, Chandler was incarcerated at Union Correctional Institution. During his seventeen years of incarceration until his execution, he did not have a single visitor.

Chandler was executed on November 15, 2011. He wrote a last statement to prison officials: "You are killing  innocent man today". The statement was read at a post-execution news conference. In February 2014, DNA evidence identified Chandler as the murderer of Ivelisse Berrios-Beguerisse, who was found dead in Coral Springs, Florida, on November 27, 1990.

Early life

Background 
Chandler was the fourth of five children born to Oba Chandler Sr. and Margaret Johnson, and was raised in Cincinnati, Ohio. When he was tenyears old in June 1957, his father hanged himself in the basement of the family's apartment. At the funeral, Chandler jumped into his father's open grave as the gravediggers were covering the coffin with dirt. Between May and September 1991concurrent with the police investigation of the Rogers family triple murderChandler was an informant for the U.S. Customs Bureau's Tampa office.

Crimes and incidents 
When Chandler was fourteen, he began stealing cars and was arrested twenty times as a juvenile. As an adult, he was charged with a variety of crimes, including possession of counterfeit money, loitering, burglary, kidnapping, and armed robbery. He was also accused of masturbating while peeping through a woman's window. In one incident, Chandler and an accomplice broke into a Florida couple's home, held them at gunpoint, and robbed them. Chandler told his accomplice to tie up the man with speaker wire and took the woman into the bedroom, where he made her strip to her underwear, tied her up, and rubbed the barrel of his revolver across her stomach.

Murder victims 

On May 26, 1989, Joan "Jo" Rogers, 36, and her daughtersMichelle, 17, and Christe, 14left their family dairy farm in Willshire, Ohio, for a vacation in Florida. It was the first time they had left their home state. Authorities believe Joan became lost on June 1 during the return drive from Orlando to Willshire, and had decided to take an extra vacation day in Tampa. While looking for their hotel they encountered Chandler, who gave them directions and offered to meet them again later to take them on a sunset cruise of Tampa Bay. Joan and her teenage daughters had left Orlando around 9:00a.m. and checked into the Days Inn on Route 60 at 12:30p.m.

Photographs retrieved from a roll of film found in a camera in the Rogers' hotel room showed Michelle sitting on the floor. The last photograph was taken from the hotel balcony and showed the sun beginning to set over Tampa Bay, confirming that all three family members were alive and had not left their hotel room as the sunset began. They were last seen alive at the hotel's restaurant at around 7:30p.m. It is believed they boarded Chandler's boat by the dock on the Courtney Campbell Causeway—part of Route 60—between 8:30p.m. and 9:00p.m., and that they were dead by 3a.m. the next day. Chandler may have used the fact that he was born in Ohio to lure them into feeling a connection to him. Chandler knew Joan and her daughters were not from Florida because he saw the Ohio license plates on their car.

The victims' bodies were found floating in Tampa Bay on June 4, 1989. The first body was found when several people on board a sailboat crossing under the Sunshine Skyway saw an object in the water. While the Coast Guard were recovering the second body, a call about a third, which was seen floating  to the east, was received. All three female bodies were found floating face down, bound with a rope around the neck, and naked below the waist.

Autopsies showed all three victims had water in their lungs, proving they had been thrown into the water while still alive. Michelle, who was identified as the second body found, had freed one hand from her bonds before she drowned. The partially dressed state of the three bodies indicated the underlying crime was sexual assault. Ropes with a concrete block at the other end had been tied around the victims' necks to ensure they died from either suffocation or drowning, and that their bodies would never be found. The bodies, however, bloated as a result of decomposition, and floated to the surface.

Investigation 

The Rogers' bodies underwent decomposition while underwater due to hot weather. Because of this, they were not identified for a week after their remains were located.

Joan Rogers and her daughters were not positively identified until a week after their bodies' discovery, by which time Joan's husband and the girls' father, Hal Rogers, had reported them missing in Ohio. On June 8, a housekeeper at the Days Inn said the Rogers family's room had not been disturbed and the beds had not been slept in. The hotel manager contacted the police. Fingerprints found in the room were matched to the bodies, and final confirmation of their identities came from dental records. Marine researchers at the University of South Florida estimated from currents and patterns that the victims were thrown from a boatand not from a bridge or dry landbetween two and five days before they were found. The Rogers' car, a 1984 Oldsmobile Calais with Ohio license plates, was found at the boat dock by the Courtney Campbell Causeway.

Facts and arrest 

The case remained unsolved for over three years, partly due to the volume of tips received by police investigators. The biggest tip came from a Madeira Beach police bulletin that described a similar rape of a 24-year-old Canadian tourist that occurred two weeks before the Rogers' murders. Chandler was arrested for the murders on September 24, 1992. His handwritten directions on a brochure found in the Rogers' vehicle and a description of his boat written by Jo Rogers on the brochure were the primary clues that led to him being named a suspect. Local police posted images of Chandler's handwriting on the brochure on billboards in the Tampa Bay area, leading to a call from a former neighbor who provided a copy of a work order Chandler had written. This use of billboards by law enforcement in the US was unusual at the time.

Through handwriting analysis, the two samples were matched. A palm print on the brochure was also matched to Chandler, who had sold his boat and left town with his family soon after the billboards appeared. Police reported that Chandler and his then-wife moved from their home on Dalton Avenue in Tampa to Port Orange near Daytona Beach.

Second suspect theory 
Investigators originally thought two men were involved in the murders of the Rogers family. This theory was used for an enaction shown in a 1991episode of Unsolved Mysteries. This theory was dismissed when Chandler was arrested. No evidence of a second manother than a former prison cellmate's claim that Chandler said another man, whose identity the cellmate claimed to know but would not revealhas ever surfaced. The second-suspect theory was belied by Chandler's approach of two Canadian female touriststhat he was willing to approach multiple potential targets by himself.

Hal Rogers's brother John was also considered a suspect, even though he was serving a prison sentence for the rape of a woman at the time of the murders. Police investigating the woman's rape allegation found evidence indicating John had also sexually assaulted Hal's daughter Michelle, although charges involving this assault were later dropped because of her reluctance to testify. The St. Petersburg Times said John may have planned the murder during a visit to his parents' property near Tampa a month before the murders. Once the police established John could not have hired a contract killer, did not have accomplices, and could not have known the timing of his sister-in-law's and nieces' trip, he was dismissed as a suspect.

Hal was also considered a suspect because he had posted bail for his brother, he states in an episode of On the Case with Paula Zahn, that he posted bail prior to knowing his brother had abused Michelle. Hal later said he had promised the family he would post bail and would not renege on his promise. Investigators from Florida and Ohio also discovered Hal had withdrawn US$7,000 from his bank account at the time of the disappearance, which he was able to account for. He had planned to use it to look for his wife and daughters before he was notified of their deaths. Investigations proved conclusively Hal had not left Ohio during that period. The assaults of Michelle Rogers by her uncle and gossip by local people was one of the reasons for the Florida trip; Joan and her daughters wanted to distance themselves from the incident.

Trial

Chandler's testimony 
At his trial in Clearwater, Florida, Chandler said he met Joan, Michelle, and Christe Rogers and gave them directions but he never saw them again except in newspaper coverage and on billboards. He acknowledged he was in Tampa Bay that nightthe police had evidence of three ship-to-shore telephone calls made from his boat to his home during the time frame of the murdersbut Chandler maintained he was fishing alone. He said he had returned home late because his engine would not start, which he attributed to a gas line leak. He also said he had called the Coast Guard and the Florida Marine Patrol, and had flagged down a patrol boat, but both were too busy to help. He said he subsequently fixed the line with duct tape and returned safely to shore.

There were, however, no records of distress calls from Chandler to either the Coast Guard or the Marine Patrol that night, nor were there any Coast Guard boats on the bay the following morning that could have helped him. According to a boat mechanic who testified for the prosecution, Chandler's explanation of repairing the boat's alleged gas leak was not tenable because the fuel lines in his boata Baylinerwere directed upward. A leak would have sprayed fuel into the air rather than into the boat and the gasoline would have dissolved the adhesive of the duct tape Chandler maintained he had used to repair a leak. Under questioning from Pinellas County prosecutor Douglas Crow, Chandler then said he could not remember.

Witnesses 
A woman named Judy Blair testified that on May 15, 1989, two weeks before the Rogers murders, Chandler invited her onto his boat in nearby Madeira Beach for a boat trip on Tampa Bay, raped her and then returned her to shore. Blair had been with her friend Barbara Mottram, who refused Chandler's offer to join them on the boat. After Blair was raped, she told the court she returned to her hotel room where Mottram was waiting. Chandler was not charged with this crime. Blair testified during Chandler's murder trial to help establish his pattern of attack and show the similarities between the two crimes.

Blair stated that Chandler, on May 14, had given his name as Dave Posner or Dave Posno when the three first met at a convenience store in Tampa. He told Blair and Mottram he was in the aluminum-siding contracting business, which later helped lead investigators to him. It also inspired the name of the investigation; "Operation Tin Man". The facial composite produced from Blair's description was posted on the billboards along with the handwriting samples.

A former employee of Chandler's testified that he bragged about dating three women on the bay on the night of the murders, and that the next morning he arrived by boat and delivered materials for a job and immediately set out again. In an attempt to establish Chandler's whereabouts on that night, investigators found records of several ship-to-shore telephone calls made from his boat to his home between 1:00a.m. and 5:00a.m., which may have been attempts to explain his absence to his wife and to provide himself with an alibi for the time of the murders. Chandler's daughter Kristal May Sue testified that her father had talked about killing three women and that he was afraid of returning to Tampa. A woman who worked as a maid at the Days Inn said she walked past Chandler on June 1 as she was going to the Rogers' room for room service. She said she did not realize the significance of this sighting until Chandler's arrest in 1992; this sighting has never been confirmed. Michelle Rogers' boyfriend and Hal Rogers also gave evidence during trial.

Sentence and aftermath 
Joan, Michelle, and Christe Rogers were buried in their hometown on June 13, 1989, after a funeral service attended by about 300family members and friends. Numerous police officers were present to keep reporters and television crews out of the church during the service.

Chandler was found guilty of the murders and was sentenced to death on November 4, 1994. He maintained his innocence and continued to pursue legal appeals while on Florida's death row. He admitted to the Madeira Beach incident but said the sex was consensual and that the victim had changed her mind during the act. Because Chandler had already been sentenced to death for the Rogers murders and because prosecutors did not want to subject Blair to the emotional trauma of a rape trial, he was never prosecuted for her rape.

Chandler awaited execution of his sentence at the Union Correctional Institution. Shortly after the trial and conviction, his wife Debra filed for divorce and their marriage was dissolved a year later. Chandler was no longer allowed to see his daughter Whitney and in accordance with his ex-wife's wishes, he was not allowed to see later photographs of her. In July 2008, Chandler was on Florida's short list of executions.

Profiling experts speculated Chandler may have killed previously, based on the belief that a first-time killer would not be experienced or bold enough to abduct and kill three women at once. Chandler remained a suspect in the 1982 murder of a woman whose body was found floating off Anna Maria Island until 2011, when the body was identified as 29-year-old Amy Hurst and her husband was arrested and charged with her murder. Chandler was never charged with another murder. All of his appeals of his 1994 conviction were denied; his last was in May 2007.

After his conviction, Chandler was named by media as one of Florida's most notorious criminals. He said his last words before his execution would be, "Kiss my rosy red ass". In May 2011, comparisons were drawn between Chandler's case and trial in 1994, and the murder case of Caylee Anthony. In both cases, heightened media attention forced the selection of jurors who lived outside the county where the crime had been committed. One of the jurors in Chandler's 1994 trial said, "He scared some of the jurors when he would sit there and stare at you and have that stupid grin on his face. He would make your skin crawl."

Judge Susan F. Schaeffer, who presided over the 1994 trial and ultimately sentenced Chandler described him in a 2011 interview as "a man with no soul". She said, "It's the worst case as far as factually, and as far as a defendant without saving grace, that I ever handled. And I represented plenty of people who were not necessarily good people."

Execution 

On October 10, 2011, Governor Rick Scott signed Chandler's death warrant. His execution was set for November 15, 2011, at 4:00p.m. His lawyer Baya Harrison said Chandler asked him not to file any frivolous appeals to keep him alive. Harrison said: He is not putting a lot of pressure on me to go running around at the end to find some magic way out. He is not going to make a scene. He's not going to bemoan the legal system. What he has told me is this: if there is some legal way that I can find to try to prevent him from being executed, he would like me to do what I reasonably can. Harrison also said Chandler suffered from high blood pressure, coronary artery disease, problems with his kidneys, and arthritis.

On October 12, 2011, Harrison said although he was preparing to file a motion regarding the violation of his client's Fifth and Fourteenth Amendment rights in the case, he was unsure whether Chandler was willing to travel to Clearwater for the court hearing or would agree to the filing of the motion. "He hates coming down to Clearwater. He doesn't like the ride and he's not well", Harrison said. On October 18, Harrison filed a motion against the execution on grounds that the way Florida imposes the death penalty is unconstitutional. A jury may recommend a life sentence or a death sentence, but under Florida law, the judge makes the final decision. A hearing on Chandler's motion was set for October 21 at 1:00pm; Chandler did not attend. On October 24, Chandler's appeal was rejected because he had already filed an appeal to the Florida Supreme Court prior to the decision. Although the Florida Supreme Court initially scheduled Chandler's appeal to be heard on November 9, 2011, they later cancelled oral argument. On November 7, 2011, the Florida Supreme Court denied Chandler's appeal of his death sentences and death warrant. The Florida Supreme Court had upheld Chandler's death sentence in 1997 and 2003. Chandler's subsequent petition to the United States Supreme Court was also denied. 

On November 15, Chandler at 4:08pm was executed by lethal injection at Florida State Prison in Raiford. Chandler declined to make a last statement before being executed but left a written statement with prison officials: "You are killing a (sic) innocent man today." Shortly after signing Chandler's death warrant, Governor Scott said; "[Chandler] killed three women, so I looked through different cases, and it made sense to do that one. There's never one thing. It was the right case."

Chandler's daughter Valerie Troxell said in an interview after the execution; "I believe they did execute an innocent man. I don't think my father alone could have pulled off such a heinous crime. It would have to have been more than one person... The palm print would prove he did meet them and gave them directions, but it didn't mean he killed them. I think the prosecution had a very weak case." Troxell also said she had sent a letter to Governor Scott asking him to commute Chandler's sentence to life imprisonment. Chandler's son Jeff said; "I truly believe he was tried and convicted by the media long before he went to trial. The media can pretty much convict you. I don't think he got a fair trial." After his execution, Chandler was described as the "loneliest man in the loneliest place on earth, death row"; he did not receive a single visitor during his years in Florida's death row unit. Another of Chandler's daughters, Suzette, said her father was a monster who got what he deserved.

Coral Springs murder 
On February 25, 2014, investigators revealed that DNA evidence identified Chandler as the murderer of 20-year-old Ivelisse Berrios-Beguerisse, who was raped and strangled in Coral Springs, Florida, on November 27, 1990.

Berrios-Beguerisse, a 20-year-old newlywed, was last seen at Sawgrass Mills Mall where she worked at a sporting goods store. When she did not return home, her husband went to the mall and found her car, a 1985 Ford Tempo, with the tires slashed. It is believed Chandler, after watching the victim for two days, slashed the tires, arrived in the guise of a helpful stranger, and offered to help. Three hours after she was reported missing, her body was found under a residential mailbox in a local neighborhood by two men returning from a fishing trip.

Berrios-Beguerisse's body was naked and had ligature marks on both wrists and legs, and brown tape stuck to her hair. The case is considered solved and closed according to police. Law enforcement agencies across Florida investigated other cold cases in areas Chandler was known to have resided.

Media coverage 
The Discovery Channel devoted a one-hour episode of its series Scene of the Crime, titled "The Tin Man", to the murder of the Rogers family. In 1997, a series of articles titled "Angels & Demons", written by Thomas French  which told the story of the murders, the capture and conviction of Chandler, and the impact of the crimes on the Rogers' family and their community in Ohio  was published in the St. Petersburg Times. The series won a 1998 Pulitzer Prize for Feature Writing.

The Rogers murders were featured in a 1991 episode of Unsolved Mysteries, which speculated that there were two attackers. The 2000 book Bodies in the Bay by Mason Ramsey is a fictionalized adaptation of the Chandler case. Author Don Davis in 2007 published the book Death Cruise covering the murders.

The case was featured in a 1999 episode of Cold Case Files on A&E titled "Bodies in the Bay," which also focused on the evidence in the case.

In 1995, Chandler, some members of his family, and Hal Rogers appeared in an episode of the Maury Povich Show featuring the case. Chandler appeared via satellite link. Chandler's case was featured in a full-hour episode of Crime Stories. The case was shown on an episode of Forensic Files titled "Water Logged" in December 2010. In 2012 Investigation Discovery show On the Case with Paula Zahn aired two episodes called "Murder at Sunset" covering the case. In August 2014, the ID series Murder in Paradise covered the case.

On February 11, 2022, the Oxygen Channel aired an episode of Family Massacre called "The Rogers Family".

On November 19, 2022, the true crime podcast Casefile detailed the case of Jo, Michelle & Christe Rogers in their 232nd episode.

See also 

 Capital punishment in Florida
 Capital punishment in the United States
 List of people executed in Florida
 List of people executed in the United States in 2011

References

External links 

Inmate information –  Florida Capital Cases
Oba Chandler v James McDonough, Charlie Crist; 471 F.3d 1360
Oba Chandler v James R. McDonough, et al; 127 S.Ct. 2269
Oba Chandler v James V. Crosby Jr., et al; 454 F.Supp.2d 1137
Oba Chandler v State of Florida; 702 So.2d 186
Oba Chandler v State of Florida; 848 So.2d 1031

1946 births
2011 deaths
20th-century American criminals
21st-century executions by Florida
21st-century executions of American people
1989 murders in the United States
American male criminals
American murderers of children
American rapists
American robbers
Executed people from Ohio
People executed by Florida by lethal injection
People from Cincinnati
American kidnappers
American counterfeiters
American burglars
Executed American serial killers
Male serial killers